The Sadeian Woman and the Ideology of Pornography is a 1978 non-fiction book by Angela Carter. The book is a feminist re-appraisal of the work of the Marquis de Sade, consisting of a collection of essays analyzing his literature, particularly the tales of sisters Juliette and Justine.

Her work was later criticized by the radical feminist and anti-porn theorist Andrea Dworkin in her 1981 book Pornography: Men Possessing Women. Unlike Dworkin, Carter sees de Sade as being the first writer to see women as more than mere breeding machines, as more than just their biology and, as such, finds him liberating.

Carter argues that Marquis de Sade was a “moral pornographer”, one that analyzed the relation between the sexes within his work. She argues that Marquis “would not be the enemy of women”, as she views his works as contradicting patriarchal notions of sex and feminity.

The Marquis de Sade’s pornography went on to influence Carter’s fictional work. In her collection of short stories published the next year, The Bloody Chamber, the opening story follows a young, unnamed French woman who is groomed into sex and marriage by the scopophiliac, Marquis.

References 

1977 non-fiction books
Books by Angela Carter
Feminist books
Works about the Marquis de Sade
Pantheon Books books